RTL Travel (formerly known as Yorin Travel) is a travel television series which first aired on the Dutch Yorin television station with host Tom Rhodes, and later became a part of the RTL Nederland network.

References

External links
 RTL Travel website

Travel television series
2000s Dutch television series
2010s Dutch television series
2020s Dutch television series
2004 Dutch television series debuts
RTL 7 original programming